The Zanzibar Cat is a science fiction collection of short stories by Joanna Russ, first published in 1983 by Arkham House. It was the author's first collection of short fiction and was published in an edition of 3,526 copies. The story "When It Changed" won a Nebula Award in 1972. "Old Thoughts, Old Balances" won a 1977 O. Henry Prize under the title "The Autobiography of My Mother".

It was reprinted  (with revised contents) by Baen in 1984.

Contents

Arkham House
 "Foreword" by Marge Piercy
 "When It Changed"
 "The Extraordinary Voyages of Amélie Bertrand"
 "The Soul of a Servant"
 "Gleepsite"
 "Nobody's Home"
 "My Dear Emily"
 "The New Men"
 "My Boat"
 "Useful Phrases for the Tourist"
 "Corruption"
 "There is Another Shore, You Know, Upon the Other Side"
 "A Game of Vlet"
 "How Dorothy Kept Away the Spring"
 "Poor Man, Beggar Man"
 "Old Thoughts, Old Presences"
 "The Zanzibar Cat"

Baen
 "When It Changed"
 "The Extraordinary Voyages of Amélie Bertrand"
 "The Soul of a Servant"
 "The Man Who Could Not See Devils"
 "Gleepsite"
 "Nobody's Home"
 "My Dear Emily"
 "There is Another Shore, You Know, Upon the Other Side"
 "My Boat"
 "Useful Phrases for the Tourist"
 "Dragons and Dimwits"
 "Corruption"
 "The Precious Object"
 "The New Men"
 "A Game of Vlet"
 "The Zanzibar Cat"

References

Sources

External links
 

1983 short story collections
Short story collections by Joanna Russ
Fantasy short story collections
Arkham House books